WMBF-TV (channel 32) is a television station licensed to Myrtle Beach, South Carolina, United States, serving as the NBC affiliate for the Grand Strand and Pee Dee regions of South Carolina. Owned by Gray Television, the station maintains studios on Frontage Road East (along US 17) in Myrtle Beach, with a secondary studio and news bureau on West Cheves Street in Florence; its transmitter is located on Flossie Road in Bucksville, South Carolina.

Among the youngest full-power television stations in the United States, WMBF-TV began broadcasting in 2008. Its construction gave the region its first in-market NBC affiliate, replacing cable and over-the-air broadcasts of two co-owned stations in adjacent markets, and a third source of TV news coverage.

History
Moore filed for the channel alongside seven other groups, but only three were still in the running in November 1986, when the FCC gave the nod to Coastal Carolina Broadcasting Company, a group of residents of Conway. Coastal Carolina's proposed station got a call sign, WCRD, but little else, being unable to secure financing.

The channel assignment lay fallow with no activity until 1996, when the FCC opened a last-chance window for filings to build new TV stations before turning the channels over to possible use for digital television facilities. An application was made by Cosmos Broadcasting, the broadcasting subsidiary of the Liberty Corporation and owner of WIS in Columbia. The president of Cosmos told The Sun News that the odds were "fairly long" for Cosmos to actually be granted the channel.

In October 2005, the FCC granted Liberty the permit. Two months earlier, though, Liberty had announced its sale to Raycom Media in a 15-station, $987 million transaction. Under the radar, the deal included the construction permit for channel 32 in Myrtle Beach. The Liberty purchase by Raycom united WIS with WECT in Wilmington. These stations had, for decades, provided NBC over-the-air and cable service in northeastern South Carolina, and both were on the Myrtle Beach cable system when it debuted in 1962; said cable system was co-owned with WIS. Beginning in 1995, WIS and Time Warner Cable had been engaged in a joint venture to produce a customized feed of the station for the Florence area, "WIS-Florence", complete with its own advertising sales staff. 

Facilities were approved in early 2007, and it was announced at that time that the station would replace WIS and WECT on regional cable systems. Raycom selected a building formerly used by cell phone company SunCom on Frontage Road and began construction later that year. For Raycom, the construction of WMBF served several goals. Because the digital television transition was looming—with the Wilmington stations, including WECT, part of a pilot switchover in September 2008—the Myrtle Beach station, built as a digital-only facility from the outset, would fill in gaps in coverage after WECT's analog signal shut down. It also would allow Raycom for the first time to sell advertising in the rapidly growing Grand Strand area and give NBC its first in-market affiliate for Myrtle Beach and Florence.

The transmitter was turned on in late July 2008, and the station began programming at 11:59 p.m. on August 7, with NBC welcoming the station on-air the following day on Today, NBC Nightly News, and Late Night with Conan O'Brien. The sign-on of WMBF-TV occurred in time for the opening ceremony of the 2008 Summer Olympics. The construction of WMBF cost Raycom an estimated $10 million.

Sale to Gray Television
In June 2018, Atlanta-based Gray Television announced it had reached an agreement to merge with Raycom in a transaction valued at $3.6 billion. The sale was approved on December 20 and completed on January 2, 2019.

Newscasts
As a new build, WMBF-TV went on the air with high-definition local newscasts from the outset, including live shots from the field. In the station's early years, managers elsewhere in the Raycom group were often instructed to seek advice from WMBF on technical issues related to HD news conversion. WMBF was the first local station to launch weekend morning newscasts, doing so in the early 2010s.

Technical information

Subchannels
The station's digital signal is multiplexed:

Translators
WMBF-TV is relayed on five low-power translators in Florence—W06DK-D, W18FC-D, W19FC-D, W24EX-D, and W35ED-D. The translators, particularly W35ED-D, provide coverage to areas outside of the main WMBF-TV transmitter's reception area. On January 3, 2022, Jeffrey Winemiller's Lowcountry 34 Media reached a deal to sell W19FC-D, W35ED-D, and 21 other low-power TV stations to Gray Television for $3.75 million.

References

External links
 

NBC network affiliates
Bounce TV affiliates
Circle (TV network) affiliates
Laff (TV network) affiliates
Grit (TV network) affiliates
Quest (American TV network) affiliates
Gray Television
Television channels and stations established in 2008
MBF-TV
2008 establishments in South Carolina